The men's long jump event at the 1986 Commonwealth Games was held on July, 31, at the Meadowbank Stadium in Edinburgh.

Results

References

Athletics at the 1986 Commonwealth Games
1986